Liliana Gafencu (born 12 July 1975 in Suceava) is a Romanian rower, who has won three Olympic gold medals in the eights competition.

References

External links
 
 
 
 

1975 births
Living people
Romanian female rowers
Rowers at the 1996 Summer Olympics
Rowers at the 2000 Summer Olympics
Rowers at the 2004 Summer Olympics
Olympic rowers of Romania
Olympic gold medalists for Romania
Sportspeople from Bucharest
Place of birth missing (living people)
Olympic medalists in rowing
Medalists at the 2004 Summer Olympics
Medalists at the 2000 Summer Olympics
Medalists at the 1996 Summer Olympics
20th-century Romanian women
21st-century Romanian women